Zenodoxus canescens is a moth of the family Sesiidae. It was described by Henry Edwards in 1881. It is known from North America, including Colorado, Arizona, California and New Mexico.

References

External links
"640050.00 – 2514 – Zenodoxus canescens – Edwards, 1881". Moth Photographers Group. Mississippi State University.

Moths described in 1881
Sesiidae